Cherie Hausler  (born 4 April 1973 in the Barossa Valley, South Australia) is a television presenter, freelance journalist, food stylist and creative director of Eat Me restaurant in Bangkok.

Career

Television
Cherie's TV career begun when she was chosen as the co-host of Pepsi Live alongside Dylan Lewis.  Opportunities grew after she took on the role as solo host of the live music show while Dylan was in the Big Brother house, with Cherie being retained as the show's roving reporter.

Cherie was then employed by TVSN which allowed her to further practise her skills in a live-to-air situation. It also gave her a chance to fulfil her dream to not only cook on television but also alongside culinary greats such as Neil Perry and Gabriel Gate.

Cherie moved onto Channel Nine screens as the co-host of Our Place, a live to air lifestyle show with Scott Cam and Cherie's culinary hero, Maggie Beer and Wine Me Dine Me with John Wood, a food and wine based travel show.

In July 2007, the Nine Network launched The Mint, with Cherie taking a role as one of the presenters.

She has also made guest appearances on Getaway, Channel Nine's Today Show, Mornings with Kerri-Anne and The Footy Show.

Journalism
Her involvement with ‘'Pepsi Live’' also gave her the chance to write for ‘'Chick'’ magazine in the guise of ‘'Dear Abby’' for their monthly column. Her love for food crept in as she recommended all types of mood boosting foods to troubled teenagers.

Cherie continues to write for magazines and devise show concepts for TV, marrying her interest in food with her new favourite subject, the Vinechange.  She has contributed to Cathay Pacific Magazine, Qantas Magazine, Green Living and Harpers Bazaar, Thailand.

Restaurant
Cherie is the creative director of the Bangkok restaurant Eat Me, co-owned with her brother, Darren Hausler.  She travels to Bangkok regularly to whip up new dishes for the menu with a modern, international and regional flavor.  She also is in charge of recipe development, food styling, marketing and publicity.  The restaurant also houses art exhibitions,  hosting local and international artists.

References

External links
 Profile at The Mint

People from South Australia
Australian television presenters
Australian women television presenters
1973 births
Living people